The Audie Award for Middle Grade Title is one of the Audie Awards presented annually by the Audio Publishers Association (APA). It awards excellence in narration, production, and content for a middle-grade audiobook intended for children ages 8 to 12 released in a given year. From 2009 to 2015 it was given as the Audie Award for Children's Title for Ages Eight to Twelve, in 2009 it was given as the Audie Award for Children's Title for Ages Eight to Eleven, from 2001 to 2009 it was given as the more expansive Audie Award for Children's Title for Ages Eight and Up, and before 2001 it was given as the more expansive Audie Award for Children's Title. It has been awarded since 1996.

Winners and finalists

1990s

2000s

2010s

2020s

References

External links 

 Audie Award winners
 Audie Awards official website

Middle Grade Audiobook
Awards established in 1996
English-language literary awards